He Sees You When You're Sleeping is a 2002 Canadian made-for-TV Christmas drama film, starring Cameron Bancroft and Erika Eleniak. It was written by Carl Binder, based on a story by Mary Higgins Clark and directed by David Winning. The film was first aired at PAX Television on December 22, 2002.

Plot
Sterling Brooks (Cameron Bancroft) is a selfish stock-broker, who happens to die in a freak accident. Now, to get an eternal place in heaven he has to reunite a family.

Cast
 Cameron Bancroft as Sterling Brooks
 Erika Eleniak as Annie Campbell
 Nickol Tschenscher as Marissa Campbell
 Eli Gabay as Junior Badgett
 Pam Hyatt as Nor Campbell
 Craig March as Eddie Badgett
 Udo Kier as Hans Kramer
Greg Evigan as Joe

Reception
Andy Webb from "The Movie Scene" gave it two out of five stars and stated: "What this all boils down to is that "He Sees You When You're Sleeping" is entertaining in a sort of its so corny it is amusing kind of way. But for me it was certainly not what I expected from a movie which is part of "The Mary Higgins Clark Collection" and the mix of humour and drama in this doesn't really work."

He Sees You When You're Sleeping won four awards. Two in the Chicago International Film Festival, for "Best Feature Length Telefilm: Drama" and "Special Achievement in Direction" for David Winning. One Columbus International Film & Video Festival for "Entertainment". And one "WorldFest Houston" for "Television and Cable Production - Feature Made for Television/Cable".

References

External links
 
 

Canadian Christmas drama films
Christmas television films
English-language Canadian films
Canadian drama television films
2000s English-language films
2000s Canadian films